Brigada Diverse în alertă! is a 1971 Romanian action film directed by Mircea Drăgan.

Cast 
 Toma Caragiu - Cpt. Panait
 Dem Rădulescu - Gogu Steriade
 Sebastian Papaiani - NCO Capsuna
 Puiu Călinescu - Trandafir
 Iurie Darie - Major Dobrescu
 Jean Constantin - Patraulea
 Dumitru Furdui - Sgt. Major Cristoloveanu
 Ion Besoiu - Vornicescu

References

External links 
 

1971 action films
1971 films
Romanian action films
1970s Romanian-language films